Rosalinda Asuncion Vicente is an associate justice of the Philippine Court of Appeals.

The Court of Appeals is the second highest judicial court in the Philippines, next only to the Philippine Supreme Court.

Early life and education
Vicente was born on November 23, 1943 in Tondo, Manila.

She earned degrees in Bachelor of Arts, magna cum laude, and Bachelor of Laws, cum laude, from the University of Santo Tomas, the oldest and largest Catholic university in Manila, Philippines.

Career
Vicente started working for the Philippine government as a lawyer at the Land Registration Authority in 1969. Later, she was promoted to senior special attorney. In 1975, she was a state counsel at the Department of Justice. Soon, she was promoted as Assistant Chief State Counsel. Vicente worked as Associate Commissioner of the Professional Regulation Commission from 1989 to 1990. Soon, she was appointed as Associate Justice of the Philippine Court of Appeals.

Academe
Vicente has been teaching in the University of Santo Tomas Faculty of Civil Law, the oldest law school in the country, for several years. She is currently a Law Professor, Bar Reviewer, and Coordinator of the Student Welfare and Development Board in the same institution.

Private life
Vicente is married to Dr. Carlos Vicente, a practicing dentist. The couple has three children.

External links
University of Santo Tomas
Department of Justice, Republic of the Philippines

References 

20th-century Filipino judges
Academic staff of the University of Santo Tomas
People from Tondo, Manila
University of Santo Tomas alumni
1943 births
Living people
21st-century Filipino judges
Filipino women judges
Justices of the Court of Appeals of the Philippines
20th-century women judges
21st-century women judges